"Jag ångrar ingenting", written by Orup and Bo Kaspers orkester, is a song performed by Lena Philipsson on her 2005 album Jag ångrar ingenting. Attention was brought to the song as Lena Philipsson performed it when hosting Melodifestivalen 2006, after causing controversies with jokes about participants. The single was released on 5 April 2006. The song also charted at Svensktoppen where it stayed for one week, on 21 May 2006 ending up at 9th position. The song also stayed at Trackslistan for one week, on 15 April 2006 peaking at number 19 on the chart.

References

2005 songs
2006 singles
Lena Philipsson songs
Swedish-language songs
Songs written by Orup
Song recordings produced by Anders Hansson